Ballylanders is a village in south County Limerick, Ireland. The 2016 census recorded a population of 308 people.

Name 
Historically the name translates as "de Londra's town" and is most likely of Norman origin and referring to a popular Anglo-Norman derived family surname of "Landers" or alternatively "de Londra" can give its translation as "Town of the Londoner".

Amenities  
There is a holy well close to the village which is the focal point of the Pattern day, held annually on 15 August, this is one of the major such fair days in the locality. In 2011 The Wolfe Tones performed in the marquee during the pattern festival.

The present-day Catholic parish church is of a modern circular design. The first church in the village was a Church of Ireland church, dated to the 19th century, is still in existence today as a private dwelling house. The arches of the church are still visible from the inside and are preserved for aesthetic value.
 
Griston Bog, on the west side of the village, is a nature reserve and bird sanctuary which is home to birds, insects and plants.

Sports 
The local Gaelic Athletic Association club, Ballylanders GAA, won the Limerick Senior Football Championship in 1917, 1999, 2007 and 2014. 

A Ballylanders Ladies' Gaelic Football Association (LGFA) club was established in 2000. Since then, the club has grown and fields teams at underage levels and two adult teams. The LGFA club were Junior Champions in 2010, Intermediate Champions in 2014 and Senior Champions in 2015, 2016 and 2017.

Ballylanders Soccer Club was established in 1987 and caters for boys and girls of varying age groups. The club has over 200 registered members, and purchased its own grounds in 1992. The  facility comprises a clubhouse, two full-size playing pitches, a full-size floodlit training pitch, and includes an amenity walk around the perimeter which is planting with 250 native trees.

Services 
There is a local transport service in the locality known as Ballyhoura Travel.

Notable people 
 John Crowley (1891-1942) was an Irish revolutionary and hunger striker, holding the Guinness World Record for the longest hunger strike in history - 94 days. Together with his brother and several prisoners, Crowley's strike was in sympathy with that of the Lord Mayor of Cork, Terence MacSwiney, imprisoned in Brixton Gaol, who died there on hunger strike in 1920.

 Peter William Crowley (1900-1963) was an Irish revolutionary and hunger striker who took part in the same hunger strike as his elder brother John.

 Tadhg Crowley (1890-1970) was an Irish Fianna Fáil politician. He was first elected to Dáil Éireann as a Teachta Dála (TD) for the Limerick constituency at the June 1927 general election.

 Frank Dineen (1862–1916) was an athlete of the early 1880s who later became the only person to ever hold both posts of president (1885–1898) and Secretary (1898–1901) of the Gaelic Athletic Association. In 1907, he fronted the purchase of the Croke Park site out of his own personal finances.

See also
 List of towns and villages in Ireland

References

Towns and villages in County Limerick
Holy wells in Ireland